Deep River Park, formerly known as 'Community Park', is a private park open to the public in Chatham County, North Carolina and Lee County, North Carolina, USA, operated by the Deep River Park Association.  The main features of the 40 acre park are the Deep River Camelback Truss Bridge and a canoe access ramp to the Deep River. The bridge is listed on the National Register of Historic Places.

Deep River Park includes land on both sides of the river in a quiet rural setting amid woods and farmlands.  Amenities include the historic pedestrian bridge, a concrete canoe and boat ramp, several picnic areas with 2 shelters, a playground, and parking (no restroom).  The park is in the Deep River State Trail corridor.

Deep River Park was founded in 1992 by the Deep River Park Association, formed to preserve the Camelback Bridge and led by Margaret Jordan-Ellis.  The Association is currently seeking funding to repaint the bridge while protecting the river from lead contamination.

Images

References

External links
 https://archive.today/20130205143151/http://visitpittsboro.com/see/gulf/deep-river-camelback-truss-bridge

Parks in North Carolina
Protected areas of Chatham County, North Carolina